Edward Buck (October 6, 1814 – July 16, 1876) was an American lawyer and writer.

Buck, the fifth son of Gurdon and Susannah (Manwaring) Buck, and a descendant of Gov. Gurdon Saltonstall, of Connecticut, was born in New York City, Oct. 6, 1814.  He graduated from Yale College in 1835.  He studied law in New York, and began practice in that city in 1838. In 1843 he removed to Boston, where he continued actively engaged in his profession until his death. From 1854 his residence was in Andover, Mass., where he died, July 16, 1876, in his 62nd year.  Buck was a frequent writer for the newspapers, and published in 1866 an important volume on Massachusetts Ecclesiastical Law (Boston, 8vo, 316 pp.). As a prominent Christian layman his interest in all educational and philanthropic matters was always intelligent and active.  He married, June 8, 1841, Elizabeth Greene, daughter of Hon. Samuel Hubbard, of Boston, a Justice of the Supreme Court of Massachusetts. She survived him with their two children, a son and a daughter. The son graduated Yale in 1870.

External links

Massachusetts Ecclesiastical Law by Buck

1814 births
1876 deaths
Lawyers from New York City
New York (state) lawyers
Massachusetts lawyers
American male writers
19th-century American lawyers